José Miguel Monzón Navarro (15 May 1955, Madrid), better known as El Gran Wyoming (The Great Wyoming), Wyoming or Guayo, is a Spanish television presenter, actor, musician, director and humorist.

He graduated in Medicine and was a doctor in the town of Buitrago del Lozoya for a short period of time.

He has hosted several programs such as Silencio se juega (1984), La noche se mueve (1992) and El peor programa de la semana (1993). Televisión Española refused to broadcast the last episode of the latter because of an interview with the writer Quim Monzó, in which a joke was made about the employment situation of the King's daughter (Elena de Borbón). The official reason given was low ratings of the program.

In 1995 he returned to TV on the private channel Telecinco. He presented Caiga quien caiga from 1996 to 2002. He was firstly critical of the last Felipe Gonzalez's socialist government and later against the conservative government of José María Aznar (PP).

In 2004 he obtained another program in Televisión Española: La azotea de Wyoming. On 4 March 2005 it was moved from Wednesday to Sundays due to the low ratings, and in 14 March it was cancelled.

Since 2006 he presents El Intermedio on laSexta, and has been the scourge of PP by systematically reporting all problems of corruption  within the conservative party.

Books
1990, Un vago, dos vagos, tres vagos. Ed. Temas de Hoy. 
1993, Te quiero personalmente. Editorial Anagrama. 
1997, Las aventuras del mapache. Ed. Alfaguara. 
2000, Janos, el niño que soñaba despierto. Ed. Agruparte. Colección de Cuentos Musicales "La mota de polvo" 
2013, No estamos locos. Planeta. 
2014, No estamos solos. Planeta. 
2016, ¡De rodillas, Monzón!. Planeta.

References

1955 births
Living people
Spanish_comedians
Spanish musicians
Spanish male film actors
Spanish television presenters
Spanish male television actors
Spanish stand-up comedians